Kelley Hannett is a Canadian para-goalball player. As a member of Canada women's national goalball team, Hannett won a gold medal at the 2004 Summer Paralympics.

References

External links
 

Year of birth missing (living people)
Living people
Female goalball players
Goalball players at the 2004 Summer Paralympics
Medalists at the 2004 Summer Paralympics
Paralympic gold medalists for Canada
Paralympic goalball players of Canada
Paralympic medalists in goalball